Renato de Souza is a Brazilian actor. He is probably best known for his appearance in the 2002 film Cidade de Deus (City of God), playing the part of Marreco/Goose. He also appears in Quase Dois Irmãos (Almost Brothers), a 2004 film.

External links

Brazilian male film actors
Living people
Year of birth missing (living people)
Place of birth missing (living people)
21st-century Brazilian male actors